In mathematics, the additive inverse of a number  is the number that, when added to , yields zero. This number is also known as the opposite (number), sign change, and negation. For a real number, it reverses its sign: the additive inverse (opposite number) of a positive number is negative, and the additive inverse of a negative number is positive. Zero is the additive inverse of itself.

For example, the additive inverse of 7 is −7, because , and the additive inverse of −0.3 is 0.3, because .

As for any inverse operation, double additive inverse has no net effect: .

Common examples
For a number (and more generally in any ring), the additive inverse can be calculated using multiplication by −1; that is, . Examples of rings of numbers are integers, rational numbers, real numbers, and complex numbers.

Relation to subtraction
Additive inverse is closely related to subtraction, which can be viewed as an addition of the opposite:
.
Conversely, additive inverse can be thought of as subtraction from zero:
.
Hence, unary minus sign notation can be seen as a shorthand for subtraction (with the "0" symbol omitted), although in a correct typography, there should be no space after unary "−".

Other properties
In addition to the identities listed above, negation has the following algebraic properties:
 , it is an Involution operation
 
 
 
 
 
 notably,

Formal definition
The notation + is usually reserved for commutative binary operations (operations where  for all , ). If such an operation admits an identity element  (such that  for all ), then this element is unique.

If + is associative, i.e.,  for all , , , then an additive inverse is unique.

.

For example, since addition of real numbers is associative, each real number has a unique additive inverse.

Other examples 
All the following examples are in fact abelian groups:

 Complex numbers: . On the complex plane, this operation rotates a complex number 180 degrees around the origin (see the image above).
 More generally, what precedes applies to all functions with values in an abelian group ('zero' meaning then the identity element of this group):
 Sequences, matrices and nets are also special kinds of functions.
Additive inversion corresponds to scalar multiplication by −1. For Euclidean space, it is point reflection in the origin. Vectors in exactly opposite directions (multiplied to negative numbers) are sometimes referred to as antiparallel.
vector space-valued functions (not necessarily linear),
This additive inverse always exists.

Non-examples 
Natural numbers, cardinal numbers and ordinal numbers do not have additive inverses within their respective sets. Thus one can say, for example, that natural numbers do have additive inverses, but because these additive inverses are not themselves natural numbers, the set of natural numbers is not closed under taking additive inverses.

See also 
 −1
 Absolute value (related through the identity ).
 Additive identity
 Inverse function
 Involution (mathematics)
 Multiplicative inverse
 Reflection symmetry
 Semigroup
 Monoid
 Group (mathematics)

Notes and references

Abstract algebra
Arithmetic
Elementary algebra